Speaker of the House of Assembly may refer to any of the following presiding officers ("speakers") of legislative bodies styled Houses of Assembly:

 Anguilla
Speaker of the Anguilla House of Assembly
 Australia
Speaker of South Australian House of Assembly
Speaker of the Tasmanian House of Assembly
 Bahamas
Speaker of the Bahamas House of Assembly
 Barbados
Speaker of the Barbados House of Assembly
 Bermuda
Speaker of the House of Assembly of Bermuda
 Canada
Speaker of the Newfoundland and Labrador House of Assembly
Speaker of the Nova Scotia House of Assembly
 Dominica
Speaker of the House of Assembly of Dominica
 Gibraltar
Speaker of the Gibraltar House of Assembly (renamed Gibraltar Parliament in 2006)
 Kiribati
Speaker of the House of Assembly of Kiribati
 Nigeria
Nigeria's state legislatures are styled "houses of assembly", each chaired by a speaker:
Speaker of the Anambra State House of Assembly 
Speaker of the Edo State House of Assembly
Speaker of the Kano State House of Assembly
Speaker of the Lagos State House of Assembly
Speaker of the Rivers State House of Assembly
 Saint Lucia
Speaker of the House of Assembly of Saint Lucia
 Saint Vincent and the Grenadines
Speaker of the House of Assembly of Saint Vincent and the Grenadines
 Eswatini
Speaker of the House of Assembly of Eswatini
 Zimbabwe
Speaker of the House of Assembly of Zimbabwe